Erzincan Yıldırım Akbulut Airport  is an airport located in Erzincan, Turkey.

Airlines and destinations

Traffic Statistics 

(*)Source: DHMI.gov.tr

References

External links

 
 

Airports in Turkey
Buildings and structures in Erzincan Province
Transport in Erzincan Province